Eshott is a village and former civil parish, now in the parish of Thirston, in Northumberland, England. In 1951 the parish had a population of 114.

A small former RAF aerodrome, Eshott Airfield, is located there.

The nearby Eshott Hall is a listed country house hotel.

Governance 
Eshott was formerly a township in Felton parish, from 1866 Eshott was a civil parish in its own right until it was abolished on 1 April 1955 to form Thirston.

References

External links
 Eshott Village Residents website

Villages in Northumberland
Former civil parishes in Northumberland